Domitia Lucilla can refer to
 Domitia Lucilla Major, Roman noblewoman, mother of the woman below (Domitia Lucilla Minor)
 Domitia Lucilla Minor (died 155–161), also known as Domitia Calvilla, mother of emperor Marcus Aurelius